İzmir Kâtip Çelebi University is a public university in İzmir, Turkey, established in 2010.

Academics

Faculties 
 Faculty of Medicine
 Faculty of Pharmacy
 Faculty of Dentistry
 Faculty of Law
 Faculty of Economics and Administrative Sciences
 Department of Business Administration
 Department of Economics
 Department of Health Institutions Management
 Department of Political Science and Public Administration
 Department of International Relations
 Department of Public Finance
 Department of International Trade and Business Administration
 Faculty of Engineering and Architecture
 Department of Architecture
 Department of Biomedical Engineering
 Department of City and Regional Planning
 Department of Civil Engineering
 Department of Computer Engineering
 Department of Electrical and Electronics Engineering
 Department of Engineering Sciences
 Department of Geomatics Engineering
 Department of Material Science and Engineering
 Department of Mechanical Engineering
 Department of Mechatronics Engineering
 Department of Petroleum and Natural Gas Engineering
 Faculty of Fisheries
 Faculty of Forestry
 Faculty of Health Sciences
 Faculty of Humanities and Social Sciences
 Faculty of Islamic Sciences
 Faculty of Naval Architecture and Ocean Engineering
 Faculty of Tourism

Graduate schools 
 Graduate School of Health Sciences
 Graduate School of Natural And Applied Sciences
 Graduate School of Social Sciences

See also
 List of universities in İzmir
 List of universities in Turkey

References

External links
 Official website 

Universities and colleges in Turkey
2010 establishments in Turkey
Educational institutions established in 2010
State universities and colleges in Turkey
Universities and colleges in İzmir

es:Universidad Katip Celebi de Esmirn
fr:Université Katip Celebi d'Izmir
it:Università Katip Celebi di Smirne
pt:Universidade Katip Celebi de Esmirna